Abraham Glantz (24 April 1907 – 10 July 1998) was a South African cricketer who played first-class cricket for Western Province from 1929 to 1940.

After making his first-class debut in the first match of the 1929–30 Currie Cup season, Glantz remained Western Province's regular wicket-keeper until World War II.

References

External links

1907 births
1998 deaths
South African cricketers
Western Province cricketers
Cricketers from Cape Town
Jewish South African sportspeople
Jewish cricketers